Kruno Prijatelj (1922–1998), was a Croatian art historian, art critic and University professor.

He introduced many artists who contributed to art in Dalmatia. Prijatelj's efforts answered many unsolved topics in Dalmatian art history.

His interest on Baroque in Dalmatia, led him to be called  Prijatelj od Baroka (Friend of the Baroque).

Early life
Prijatelj was born in Split, Croatia. He grew up during the Second World War. He studied art history in Zagreb and Rome. Eventually he graduated from the University of Zagreb in 1946. The following year he received his Ph.D. in Zagreb. His thesis was on the Baroque period in Split.

Between 1950 - 1979, he worked as the director in Gallery of Fine Arts in Split. These were his most fertile years. Prijatelj was the most important Croatian scholar of his generation in Dalmatian art history, particularly in the Baroque period.

He wrote about the figures of Dalmatian art, and rediscovered lesser-known artists such as Matteo Ponzone.

Beginning in 1972, he taught contemporary art history at the Faculty of Philosophy in Zagreb, as adjunct professor. From 1979, he taught art history at the University of Zadar until his retirement in 1991. Since 1968, he was a regular member of Yugoslav Academy of Sciences and Arts.

He died in Split in 1998.

Selected works

His works include:

 Barok u Splitu, Split 1947
 Ivan Duknović, (1957.)
 Studije o umjetninama u Dalmaciji I, Zagreb 1963
 Klasicistički slikari Dalmacije, Split 1964
 Le opere di Matteo Ponzone in Dalmazia , in Arte Veneta, XX, 1966, pp. 153–154.
 Slikar Blaž Jurjev, 1965
 Studije o umjetninama u Dalmaciji II, Zagreb 1968
 Studije o umjetninama u Dalmaciji III, Zagreb 1975
 Studije o umjetninama u Dalmaciji IV, Zagreb 1983
 Dalmatinsko slikarstvo 15. i 16. stoljeća, Zagreb 1983
 Antun Motika (1902.-1992.), Zagreb 1992
 Kroz povijest umjetnosti u Dalmaciji (XIII-XIX. st.), Split 1995

References

External links

1922 births
1998 deaths
Writers from Split, Croatia
Members of the Croatian Academy of Sciences and Arts
Croatian art historians
Croatian art critics
Faculty of Humanities and Social Sciences, University of Zagreb alumni
Academic staff of the University of Zagreb
Yugoslav historians
Academic staff of the University of Zadar